The Golden Triangle is an area of Southeast Texas between the cities of Beaumont, Port Arthur, and Orange. 

The term more generally refers now to the entire Beaumont-Port Arthur-Orange metropolitan area, forming the triangle.

External links

References

Geography of Texas
Geography of Jefferson County, Texas
Geography of Orange County, Texas